Mehboob Khan better known as Chef Mehboob is a Pakistani chef, a television personality and a cooking expert. He is known for his cooking shows Zauq Zindagi and Good Healthy Life on ARY Zauq. He is also an author of cookbook Food for Life. He served as a Judge in cooking competition MasterChef Pakistan.

Biography
Khan was born in 1969 to a Pathan descent family in Karachi. His birth name is Mehboob Mandokhel but he uses the name Khan. He completed his early education in Karachi and started his career as a Chef in 1986.

Television shows
Khan appears as a chef in these shows:

References

External links
 
 
 

1969 births
Living people
People from Karachi
People from Sindh
Pakistani chefs
Pashtun people